The following is a list of programmes that were broadcast by Zee Zindagi, also known as Zindagi TV.

Current programming

Zindagi Originals

Acquired series 

Above dramas listed are not aired by Zindagi channel when it is used to air on Television platform. However, these dramas are broadcast by ZEE5 without any prior advertisement.

Former programming

References

External links
 Official website of Zindagi TV

Zindagi (TV channel)